"It Will Make Me Crazy" is a song by British DJ and producer Francis Wright, known under the pseudonym of Felix. It was released in October 1992, as the second single from his debut album, #1 (1993), and features vocalist Steele, also known as Sam Brown. The song topped the chart in Finland and reached the top-5 in Switzerland, Ireland and Germany. Additionally, it was also a top-10 hit in Austria, Belgium, Denmark, the Netherlands, Sweden and Switzerland. In the UK, it peaked at number 11 and on the Eurochart Hot 100, it reached number seven. Outside Europe, the single peaked at number 14 in Israel and number 55 in Australia.

Critical reception
Tim Southwell from Smash Hits commented, "Not quite as catchy as previous smash "Don't You Want Me", but play it extremely loud and you won't be able to hold yourself back. It's ravey, it's manic and it's getting people dancing like mad things from Putney to Prestwick."

Music video
A partially black-and-white music video was produced to promote the single, directed by British director Lindy Heymann. It features singer Steele and dancers performing in a basement. The video received heavy rotation on MTV Europe and was later published on Felix' official YouTube channel in April 2012. It had generated almost 1 million views as of December 2022.

Track listings
 7-inch single, Europe (1992)
 "It Will Make Me Crazy" (edit) – 3:50
 "It Will Make Me Crazy" (Red Jelly edit) – 3:30

 12-inch, UK (1992)
 "It Will Make Me Crazy" (Big mix)
 "It Will Make Me Crazy" (Felix's piano mix)
 "It Will Make Me Crazy" (Red Jelly mix)
 "It Will Make Me Crazy" (Mmmm mix)

 CD single, Europe (1992)
 "It Will Make Me Crazy" (edit) – 3:52
 "It Will Make Me Crazy" (Big mix) – 5:55
 "It Will Make Me Crazy" (Felix's piano mix) – 4:51
 "It Will Make Me Crazy" (Red Jelly mix) – 6:05
 "It Will Make Me Crazy" (Mmmm mix) – 5:41

 CD maxi, Europe (1992)
 "It Will Make Me Crazy" (edit) – 3:50
 "It Will Make Me Crazy" (Big mix) – 5:54
 "It Will Make Me Crazy" (Felix's piano mix) – 4:49
 "It Will Make Me Crazy" (Red Jelly mix) – 6:02

Charts

Weekly charts

Year-end charts

References

1992 singles
1992 songs
Deconstruction Records singles
Felix (musician) songs
Music videos directed by Lindy Heymann
Number-one singles in Finland